The 2nd Seiyu Awards ceremony was held on March 8, 2008, at the UDX Theater (former Akiba 3D Theater) in Akihabara, Tokyo, and was broadcast on BS11 on May 4, 2008. The period of general voting lasted from October 20, 2007, to January 15, 2008.

References

Seiyu Awards ceremonies
Seiyu
Seiyu
2008 in Japanese cinema
2008 in Japanese television